Washington Oaks Gardens State Park is a Florida State Park located near Palm Coast, Florida, along A1A. The park is most famous for its formal gardens, but it also preserves the original habitat of a northeast Florida barrier island.

Ecology
Habitats preserved by the park include beach, coastal scrub, coastal hammock, and tidal marshes.

Flora
Vegetation includes southern live oaks (Quercus virginiana), magnolias, hickories (Carya spp.), cabbage palmettos (Sabal palmetto), and saw palmettos (Serenoa repens). Plants that can be found in the gardens are roses, camellias, and azaleas, among others.

Fauna
Wildlife include sea turtles, Florida gopher tortoises, West Indian manatees, white-tailed deer, raccoons, bobcats, foxes, Virginia opossums, eastern gray squirrels, pileated woodpeckers, northern cardinals, bald eagles, peregrine falcons, and Florida scrub jays.

History
The park's land has a rich history. Native Americans found the area a productive hunting and fishing area. After European settlement of Florida, the property had a number of owners and was used for various agricultural purposes. One owner was a surveyor named George Washington, a relative of President George Washington. In 1936, Louise Powis Clark, wife of the industrialist Owen D. Young purchased the property as a winter retirement home. She devised the name "Washington Oaks" for the property and is responsible for developing the park's formal gardens, citrus groves, and house. Mr. Young died in 1962 and Mrs. Young donated the property to the State of Florida in 1964. Her donation specified that the "gardens be maintained in their present form".

Recreational activities

The park has such amenities as beaches (on both the Matanzas River and Atlantic Ocean), bicycling, fishing, hiking, picnicking areas and wildlife viewing. The original residence has been converted into a visitor center with interpretive exhibits.

Hours and admission
Florida state parks are open between 8 a.m. and sundown every day of the year (including holidays). An admission fee is required.

Gallery

References

External links

 Washington Oaks Gardens State Park at Florida State Parks
 Washington Oaks Gardens State Park at State Parks
 Washington Oaks Gardens State Park at  Tour Crane's Roost
 Washington Oaks State Gardens at Absolutely Florida

Buildings and structures completed in 1936
Parks in Flagler County, Florida
State parks of Florida
Protected areas established in 1964
Gardens in Florida
Palm Coast, Florida
Historic districts on the National Register of Historic Places in Florida
National Register of Historic Places in Flagler County, Florida
1964 establishments in Florida